Heather Irene McKillop is a Canadian-American archaeologist, academic, and Maya scholar, noted in particular for her research into ancient Maya coastal trade routes, seafaring, littoral archaeology, and the long-distance exchange of commodities in pre-Columbian Mesoamerica.

Education 
Heather McKillop has a Bachelor of Science and Master of Arts in Anthropology from Trent University, located in Peterborough, Ontario.  She received her Ph.D. in Anthropology from the University of California in Santa Barbara, California.

Career 
Heather McKillop has carried out archaeological fieldwork on the coast, cays and underwater in Belize since 1979.  

Since the 2004 discovery of ancient Maya wooden architecture and a wooden canoe paddle preserved in a peat bog below the sea floor, McKillop and her team of Louisiana State University (LSU) students and colleagues have been focused on the discovery, mapping, excavation, sediment coring and analyses of the waterlogged remains. She started the DIVA Lab (Digital Imaging and Visualization in Archaeology) in 2008 to make 3D digital images of the waterlogged wood, pottery, and other artifacts from the underwater Maya sites—Paynes Creek Salt Works.  McKillop is Thomas and Lillian Landrum Alumni Professor in the Department of Geography and Anthropology at LSU.

She is the William G. Haag Professor of Archaeology a Louisiane State University in Baton Rouge, Louisiana.

McKillop has published 57 publications, which have been viewed 6.646 and cited 934.

Publications
 The Belize maritime long distance trade in an intermediate area, 1981
 Moho Cay, Belize : preliminary investigations of trade, settlement, and marine resource exploitation, 1987
 Coastal Maya trade, 1989
 Wild Cane Cay : an insular classic period to postclassic period Maya trading station, 1987
 Salt : white gold of the ancient Maya, 2002
 Ancient Maya: New Perspectives (Understanding ancient civilizations), 2004
 In search of Maya sea traders, 2005
 The ancient Maya : new perspectives, 2006
 Maya salt works, 2019

References

External links 
 LSU biography
 AIA Lecturer biography

1953 births
Living people
American archaeologists
Canadian archaeologists
American Mesoamericanists
Canadian Mesoamericanists
Mesoamerican archaeologists
Mayanists
20th-century Mesoamericanists
21st-century Mesoamericanists
Trent University alumni
University of California, Santa Barbara alumni
Louisiana State University faculty
Canadian women scientists
Women Mesoamericanists
American women archaeologists
20th-century American women scientists
21st-century American women scientists
20th-century American non-fiction writers
21st-century American non-fiction writers
20th-century American women writers
21st-century American women writers
American women academics